The 1938 Ohio Bobcats football team was an American football team that represented Ohio University as a member of the Buckeye Athletic Association (BAA) during the 1938 college football season. In their 15th season under head coach Don Peden, the Bobcats compiled a 7–2 record (3–1 against conference opponents), tied for the BAA championship, and outscored opponents by a total of 161 to 89.

Schedule

References

Ohio
Ohio Bobcats football seasons
Ohio Bobcats football